Defleshed is a Swedish death/thrash metal band. The group was formed by guitarist Lars Löfven, formerly of Convulsion and Inanimate. He was joined by ex-Crematorium bassist Gustaf Jorde shortly after recording a demo. In 1995 drummer Matte Modin joined the band. They have released several albums on high-profile metal labels. In November 2005, it was announced that Defleshed had officially split-up.
The band also had a side project named Vargavinter.

In January 2021, Defleshed announced they had reformed and they were working on new material. In July 2022, the band announced they had signed with Metal Blade Records and would be releasing their new album, Grind Over Matter, on October 28, which will be the band's first album in 17 years.

Discography

Albums
Abrah Kadavrah (1996)
Under the Blade (Metal Blade Records, 1997)
Fast Forward (Pavement Music, 1999)
Royal Straight Flesh (Regain Records, 2002)
Reclaim the Beat (Candlelight Records, 2005)
Grind Over Matter (Metal Blade Records, 2022)

EPs
Ma Belle Scalpelle (1994)
Death... The High Cost of Living (Crash Records, 2000)

Demos
Defleshed (1992)
Abrah Kadavrah (demo) (1992)

Members

Current members
Gustaf Jorde – vocals, bass (Raubtier)
Lars Löfven – guitars
Matte Modin – drums, (Raised Fist, ex-Dark Funeral)

Former members
Oskar Karlsson – drums
Kristoffer Griedl – guitar
Robin Dohlk – vocals (on Defleshed demo)
Johan Hedman – vocals (on Abrah Kadavrah demo)

References

External links
 Defleshed on Myspace
[ Defleshed] at Allmusic.com

Swedish death metal musical groups
Swedish thrash metal musical groups
Musical groups established in 1991
Musical groups disestablished in 2005
1991 establishments in Sweden
Musical groups reestablished in 2021